Antonio Williams (born October 25, 1986), better known by his stage name Antwon, is an American rapper based in San Jose, California. In 2013, he was included on Complexs "15 Unsigned Rappers Who Should Get a Deal After SXSW" list. He was also included on Complexs "25 New Rappers to Watch Out For in 2014" list.

Biography
Born in Key West, Florida, to an African-American father and a Filipino mother, Antwon grew up in Sunnyvale, California. He was a member of the Philadelphia-based hardcore band Leather, as well as the pop punk bands Sour Patch and How to: Summer.

Antwon's first mixtape, Fantasy Beds, was released in 2011. In that year, he also released My Westside Horizon.

In 2012, Antwon released a mixtape, End of Earth. SF Weekly included it on the "10 Best Bay Area Hip-Hop Records of 2012" list. In 2013, he released a mixtape, In Dark Denim. It was listed as Spins "Rap Release of the Week".

His first official studio album, Heavy Hearted in Doldrums, was released on UNIF and Nature World in 2014. In 2016, he released an EP, Double Ecstasy, on Anticon. In 2017, he released a mixtape, Sunnyvale Gardens. Red Bull placed it at number 20 on the "20 Best Hip-Hop Mixtapes of 2017" list.

Style and influences
Spin described Antwon as "an affable guy who might have one of rap's biggest, best-sounding voices, which he usually focuses on goofy jokes and surprisingly sweet bedroom raps." He has often been compared to The Notorious B.I.G. He noted Kid Rock as his greatest influence.

Controversy
In 2016, Antwon formed Secret Circle along with Wiki and Lil Ugly Mane. Since then, the group released several tracks and played live performances across North America. In 2018, Lil Ugly Mane announced the breakup of the group, not initially indicating a specific reason for the breakup. Antwon posted a statement on Twitter, alluding to unnamed allegations. Wiki and Lil Ugly Mane subsequently indicated that the allegations mentioned in Antwon's statement, including abusive treatment of women, were the impetus for the breakup.

Discography

Studio albums
 Heavy Hearted in Doldrums (2014)

Remix albums
 Heavy Hearted in the Function: Depressed Teenager Remixes (2014)

Compilation albums
 Collection: 2005-2007 (2011)

Mixtapes
 Fantasy Beds (2011)
 My Westside Horizon (2011)
 End of Earth (2012)
 In Dark Denim (2013)
 Sunnyvale Gardens (2017)
 Downtown Tony (2019)

EPs
 Cocaine and Hennessy (2012) 
 End of Earth Pre Tracks (2012)
 Double Ecstasy (2016)
 The 45 Plates EP (2020) 
 Life in Exile (2020)

Singles
 "Big Girls" (2011)
 "Living Every Dream" (2012)
 "Underwater Tank" (2012) 
 "Helicopter" (2013)
 "Automatic" (2013)
 "Dying in the P****" (2013)
 "25th St. Sessions" (2016) 
 "FNF" (2019) 
 "Reign in England" (2019)
 "DMT" (2020) 
 "Perry Jules" (2020)

Guest appearances
 Isaiah Toothtaker - "Waterbed Wave" from Sea Punk Funk (2012)
 Shadowrunners - "Smooth" from Cyberdine (2012)
 Mishka & Rad Reef - "Hyperbolic Chamber Music" (2012)
 Hot Sugar - "No Joke" from Midi Murder (2012)
 Hot Sugar - "Mama, I'm a Man" and "56k" from Made Man (2013)
 Juiceboxxx - "Pump It (Remix)" (2013)
 Kitty - "Scout Finch Bitch" from D.A.I.S.Y. Rage (2013)
 Lil Ugly Mane - "Underwater Tank" from The Weeping Worm (2014)
 Jesse Medina - "Dream Big, Think Bigger" from Meet Jesse Medina (2014)
 Little Pain - "Pain Killers" from L.I.T.T.L.E. (2014)
 Pictureplane - "Total Confusion" (2015)
 Crookers - "Strokin'" from Sixteen Chapel (2015)
 Shy Girls - "Xhampagne" from 4WZ (2015)
 Wiki - "Whole Half" and "Patience" from Lil Me (2015)
 Wiki - "God Bless Me (Remix)" (2016)
 clipping. - "Back Up" from Wriggle (2016)
 Corbin - "Something Safe" from Mourn (2017)

References

External links
 

1986 births
Living people
West Coast hip hop musicians
People from San Jose, California
Songwriters from California
Rappers from California
African-American male rappers
American male rappers
American rappers of Filipino descent
People from Key West, Florida
Songwriters from Florida
People from Sunnyvale, California
21st-century American rappers
21st-century American male musicians
African-American songwriters
21st-century African-American musicians
20th-century African-American people
American male songwriters